KFTE (105.1 FM, "Classic Rock 105.1") is a commercial radio station in Abbeville, Louisiana, broadcasting to the Lafayette, Louisiana, area. KFTE airs a classic rock music format, and is owned by Townsquare Media.  Its studios are located on Bertrand Road in Lafayette, and its transmitter is located north of Abbeville, Louisiana.

History

KFTE was established as KROF-FM 104.9, sister station to KROF (960 AM), on May 25, 1974. It initially simulcasted KROF during the day and continued its broadcasts at night. The call letters were changed to KASC on November 1, 1980.
In 1994, Schilling Distributing Co., a beer distributor, bought the station from Mid-Acadiana Broadcasting. Previously, it was the last alternative rock station under Townsquare Media ownership since Townsquare Media is withdrawing alternative rock stations from ownership. For example, some Townsquare Media stations dumped the format entirely such as WGRD-FM in Grand Rapids, Michigan. In 2012, KFTE shifted to Mainstream Rock.

On January 19, 2017, KFTE changed their format to classic rock, branded as "Classic Rock 105.1".

Previous logo

References

External links
KFTE official website

Classic rock radio stations in the United States
Radio stations in Louisiana
Radio stations established in 1974
1974 establishments in Louisiana
Townsquare Media radio stations